This is chronological list of action films released in the 1980s. Often there may be considerable overlap particularly between action and other genres (including horror, comedy, and science fiction films); the list should attempt to document films which are more closely related to action, even if they bend genres.

See also
 Action films
 Martial arts films
 Swashbuckler films

Notes

1980s
 
Action